Tollbodgata is a street in Kristiansand, Norway.  The street is one way westbound with sidewalks on both sides of the road.  It consists mostly of apartments, houses and stores.

Places of note 
Kristiansand and Vest-Agder main police station and courthouse, and Kristiansand's largest high school Kvadraturen Skolesenter lies on the street.  The Sandens Mall and multiple banks also reside along the street.

The street is an important road for the local city bus lines in Kristiansand.

Bus stops
 Tollbodgata nedre (northbound and westbound)
 Tollbodgata/Markens gate (westbound)
 Tollbodgata/Kirkegata (westbound terminus)
 Rådhuset pl. N (west and northbound)
 Rådhuset pl. M (northbound)
 Tinghuset (all directions)
 Kvadraturen skolesenter (all directions)

Crossing streets (east to west)
 Elvegata
 Kronprinsens gate
 Holbergs gate
 Festningsgata
 Kirkegata
 Markens gate
 Vestre Strandgate

References

Geography of Kristiansand
Streets in Kristiansand